Ologies with Alie Ward, also known as Ologies, is a weekly science podcast hosted by Alie Ward. Each episode, Ward interviews an expert from a distinct scientific field (somnology, bryology, philematology, etc.). Ologies is usually one of the top three science podcasts on Apple Podcasts.

History
Ward first had the idea for the podcast in 2002. After building a following on Patreon, Ward launched Ologies in 2017. By February 2021, Ologies released more than 130 episodes and acquired more than 50 million downloads. 

In July 2021, Ologies began releasing shortened versions of classic episodes called "Smologies." Edited specifically for classrooms, Smologies episodes run roughly 20 minutes without profanity. 

In 2022, the iHeartRadio Podcast Awards named Ologies “Best Science Podcast” and the Webby Awards honored Ward “Best Podcast Host.”

See also
 List of science podcasts

References

Audio podcasts
2017 podcast debuts
Infotainment
Science podcasts
Webby Award winners
American podcasts